Robert Henry Francis Valentine (born 15 June 1950) is an Australian politician. He was the Lord Mayor of the City of Hobart local government area, in the State of Tasmania, Australia, from 1999 to 2011. In 2012, he was elected to the Tasmanian Legislative Council for the division of Hobart.

Valentine is the great-grandson of Francis David Valentine, who was Mayor from 1925 to 1926.

Valentine is also the great-nephew of Edward Brooker (a previous premier of Tasmania) and is the longest continuously-serving Lord Mayor in the History of Hobart (since 1853).

References

1950 births
Living people
Members of the Tasmanian Legislative Council
Mayors and Lord Mayors of Hobart
Independent politicians in Australia
Recipients of the Centenary Medal
21st-century Australian politicians
Tasmanian local councillors